Amati is the last name of a family of Italian violin makers who lived at Cremona from about 1538 to 1740. Their importance is considered equal to those of the Bergonzi, Guarneri, and Stradivari families. Today, violins created by Nicolò Amati are valued at around $600,000. Because of their age and rarity, Amati instruments are mostly kept in museum or private collections and are seldom played in public.

Family members

Andrea Amati

Andrea Amati (December 20, 1577) designed and created the violin, viola and cello known as the "violin family". Based in Cremona, Italy, he standardized the basic form, shape, size, materials and method of construction. Makers from nearby Brescia experimented, such as Gasparo da Salò, Micheli, Zanetto and Pellegrino, but it was Andrea Amati who gave the modern violin family their definitive profile.

A claim that Andrea Amati received the first order for a violin from Lorenzo de' Medici in 1555 is invalid as Lorenzo de' Medici died in 1492. A number of Andrea Amati's instruments survived for some time, dating between 1538 (Amati made the first Cello called "The King" in 1538) and 1574. The largest number of these are from 1560, a set for an entire orchestra of 38 ordered by Catherine de Médicis the regent queen of France and bore hand painted royal French decorations in gold including the motto and coat of arms of her son Charles IX of France. Of these 38 instruments ordered, Amati created violins of two sizes, violas of two sizes and large-sized cellos. They were in use until the French revolution of 1789 and only 14 of these instruments survived. His work is marked by selection of the finest materials, great elegance in execution, soft clear amber, soft translucent varnish, and an in depth use of acoustic and geometrical principles in design.

Antonio and Girolamo Amati 
Andrea Amati was succeeded by his sons Antonio Amati (–1607) and Girolamo Amati (–1630). "The Brothers Amati", as they were known, implemented far-reaching innovations in design, including the perfection of the shape of the f-holes. They are also thought to have pioneered the modern alto format of viola, in contrast to older tenor violas, but the widespread belief that they were the first ones to do so

Nicolo Amati

Nicolò Amati (December 3, 1596April 12, 1684) was the son of Girolamo Amati. He was the most eminent of the family. He improved the model adopted by the rest of the Amatis and produced instruments capable of yielding greater power of tone. His pattern was unusually small, but he also made a wider model now known as the "Grand Amati", which have become his most sought-after violins.

Of his pupils, the most famous were Antonio Stradivari and Andrea Guarneri, the first of the Guarneri family of violin makers. (There is much controversy regarding the apprenticeship of Antonio Stradivari. While the label on Stradivari's first known violin states that he was a pupil of Amati, the validity of his statement is questioned.

Girolamo Amati (Hieronymus II) 
The last maker of the family was Nicolò's son, Girolamo Amati, known as Hieronymus II (February 26, 1649February 21, 1740). He improved the arching of his father's instruments.

Extant Amati instruments

Amati instruments include some of the oldest extant examples of the violin family, dating to as far back as the mid-16th century. , they are only occasionally played in public.

United Kingdom
Instruments in the UK include Andrea Amati violins from the set delivered to Charles IX of France in 1564.
 Amati instruments at the Ashmolean Museum, Oxford.
 Andrea Amati
 Violin, 1564 (ex–French royal collection)
 Viola
 Amati instruments at the Royal Academy of Music Museum, London
 Amati instrument at the Tullie House Museum and Art Gallery, Carlisle
 Andrea Amati
 Violin, 1564 (ex French royal collection)
 Nicolò Amati
 Double bass of 1631 played by Chi-chi Nwanoku

United States
Amati instruments at the Metropolitan Museum of Art (New York)
Andrea Amati:
 Violin, 
 Nicolò Amati:
 Violin, 1669

 Amati instruments at the National Music Museum (University of South Dakota):
 Andrea Amati:
 "The King", circa 1545, the world's oldest extant cello
 Viola, 1560
 Violin, 1560
 Violin, 1574
 Girolamo Amati:
 Double bass, 1680
 Violin, 1604
 Violin, 7/8-size, 1609
 Violino piccolo, 1613
 Nicolò Amati:
 Violin, 1628

In popular culture
 Patrick O'Brian's fictional British sea captain Jack Aubrey is described as owning a "fiddle far above his station, an Amati no less", in The Surgeon's Mate. In the Wine-Dark Sea, book fifteen of the series, Stephen Maturin now has a Girolamo Amati and Aubrey a Guarneri.
 In Satyajit Ray's short story Bosepukure Khoonkharapi, the fictional detective Feluda deduces that a character was murdered because he owned an Amati violin.
 In the manga and anime series Gunslinger Girl, Henrietta carries an Amati violin case. It contains a Fabrique Nationale P90 when on a mission, otherwise it contains a real violin.
 On the radio show, Yours Truly, Johnny Dollar, the January 1956 episode "The Ricardo Amerigo Matter" centered on a stolen Amati violin.
 In the 2022 Cormac McCarthy novels, The Passenger and Stella Maris, Alicia Western purchases an Amati violin for more than $200,000 while she is in her mid- to late teens, paying in cash from money she inherited. In Stella Maris, she relates this to her psychiatrist while in a psychiatric hospital, describing the details of the purchase and some history of the Amati instruments. McCarthy, C., The Passenger and Stella Maris, New York: Knopf (2022).

See also
 Antonio Stradivari
 Amati Quartet
 Dom Nicolò Amati (1662–1752), Italian luthier not part of this family but who adopted this surname
 Luthier
 San Maurizio, Venice

Notes

References
Dilworth, John (1992), "The Violin and Bow-Origins and Development" in: The Cambridge Companion to the Violin, ed. Robin Stowell. Cambridge: Cambridge University Press, pp. 1–29.

External links
 Andrea Amati: Violin, Heilbrunn Timeline of Art History, The Metropolitan Museum of Art
Instruments of the Amati family on the online database MIMO, website mimo-international.com.

Amati instruments
Luthiers from Cremona
Italian families